Fight It Out is a 1920 American short silent Western film directed by Albert Russell and starring Hoot Gibson.

Cast
 Hoot Gibson as Sandy Adams
 Charles Newton as Duncan McKenna
 Jim Corey as Slim Allen
 Dorothy Wood as Jane McKenna
 Ben Corbett as Henchman

See also
 List of American films of 1920
 Hoot Gibson filmography

References

External links
 

1920 films
1920 Western (genre) films
1920 short films
American silent short films
American black-and-white films
Films directed by Albert Russell
Silent American Western (genre) films
1920s American films